Hillside Cemetery may refer to:

United States
(by state then city)
 Hillside Cemetery (Anniston, Alabama), listed on the NRHP in Calhoun County, Alabama
 Hillside Cemetery (North Adams, Massachusetts), NRHP-listed
 Hillside Cemetery (Shrewsbury, Massachusetts), one of the United States' cemeteries
 Hillside Cemetery (Westford, Massachusetts), NRHP-listed
 Hillside Cemetery (Weare, New Hampshire)
 Hillside Cemetery (Madison, New Jersey), a Presbyterian historic site
 Hillside Cemetery (Scotch Plains, New Jersey)
 Hillside Cemetery (Middletown, New York), NRHP-listed
 Hillside Memorial Park Cemetery, in Culver City, California